Zell am See  is the administrative capital of the Zell am See District in the Austrian state of Salzburg. Located in the Kitzbühel Alps, the town is an important tourist destination due to its ski resorts and shoreline on Lake Zell. While Zell am See has been a favored winter and summer resort for the European aristocracy since the 19th century, it is known as a hub of the international jet set today.

Geography
The Zell Valley is a corridor in the Kitzbühel Alps, connecting the Saalfelden Basin of the Saalach River in the north and the Salzach in the south. The historic centre of Zell am See is located on the western shore of the  Lake Zell, with the villages of Thumersbach to the east, Erlberg to the southeast, and Schüttdorf directly to the south.

Subdivisions

The village of Zell am See comprises five cadastral communities:
Bruckberg, a residential area including the Zellermoos locality
Erlberg on the southeastern shore of Lake Zell, including a nature reserve
Schmitten, above Zell am See proper, location of many cableways
Thumersbach, an affluent district and lakeside resort on the eastern shore, including the summer resort of Prielau in the north
Zell am See, with the Old Town centre and Zell am See-Süd (Schüttdorf)

Landscape
The original Lake Zell reached somewhat further to the north and extended south to the Salzach river. The dimensions of the lake, however, have changed over time into marsh areas.

The mountains of the area form a horseshoe shape, the slopes are mainly forested or covered with Alpine pastures. The Hausberg ("home mountain") of Zell am See is the Schmittenhöhe, which together with the adjacent Salzburg Slate Alps range in the west is part of the Greywacke zone between Northern Limestone and Central Eastern Alps. Mt. Schmittenhöhe is a popular centre for skiing and winter sports.

Tourism

Skiing 
Zell am See provides winter skiing on the above Schmittenhöhe mountain. The skiable area is approximately 138 km, including the pistes on the Kitzsteinhorn and Kaprun Maiskogel. The ski pass covers the whole area including transport to and from the glacier which is open most of the year, dependent on snowfall. Zell am See is a low-altitude ski area and snow cover can suffer from higher temperatures, but the glacier has snow cover most of the year.

In 2017 Zell am See announced a potential merger with Saalbach-Hinterglemm ski resort. In the 2019-2020 ski season the Zell am See Express 1 gondola was opened which allows access to the Zell am See Express 2 gondola at the base of piste 21 from Viehofen.

Notable ski pistes in the resort include: The Trassabfahrt (14) which is the steepest piste in the region reaching an incline gradient of up to 75%, the Standardabfahrt (13) which is another valley run reaching an incline gradient of 60%, and the recently reopened Tannwaldabfahrt (21), a ski racing piste in the 1930s, and is well known for being consistently icy, and having a high steepness-width ratio in some sections of the piste.

Luxury tourism and Porsche family 
In the 19th century, Zell am See became known as a summer and winter resort for the Austrian and European aristocracy, such as the Empress Elisabeth "Sissi" of Austria, Emperor Franz Joseph or the von Trapp family.

Zell am See is the seat of the Porsche family, which has significantly contributed to the town's international standing. Since 2001, the family operates the local airport, and in 2007 the Ferry Porsche Congress Center for conventions was completed. In cooperation with the municipality, the Porsche family annually hosts the International Porsche Days in summer and the Greger Porsche Ice Race (since 1952) in winter. The family also owns the Schloss Prielau hotel, situated in a historic castle formerly owned by Hugo von Hoffmansthal on the shore of Lake Zell. The family's private estate is located in the district of Zell am See-Süd.

In the 21st century, Zell am See became a popular summer vacation spot for wealthy Russians and Arabs, many of whom spend their whole summer in one of the luxury lakefront hotels.

History

The area of Zell am See was continuously populated at least since Roman times. About 740 AD, by order of Bishop Johannes (John) I of Salzburg, monks founded the village within the stem duchy of Bavaria, which was mentioned as Cella in Bisonzio in a 743 deed. The denotation Cella or German: Zelle refers to a monk's cell in the sense of a monastery, Bisonzio is the name of the Pinzgau region. Zell received the rights of a market town in 1357. During the German Peasants' War in 1526, the area was a site of heavy fighting against the troops of Swabian League. The Zell am See citizens had not participated in the uprising, nevertheless 200 years later, numerous Protestant inhabitants were expelled from Salzburg by order of Prince-Archbishop Count Leopold Anton von Firmian.

From 1800, the town was occupied by French troops during the Napoleonic Wars. After the secularisation of the Salzburg Archbishopric, "Zell am See" finally passed to the Austrian Empire by resolution of the Vienna Congress in 1816. When in 1850 neighbouring Saalfelden became the capital of the Pinzgau district, the town's mayor successfully strived for relocating the administrative seat to Zell. The town's development was decisively promoted by the opening of the Salzburg-Tyrol Railway line (Giselabahn) on 30 July 1875, starting the annual summer tourism season. Zell am See received city rights on 24 January 24, 1928.

Timeline
1879, 15 July - Opening of the Hotel "Elisabeth"
1881 - Start of steam navigation with boat "Elisabeth" on the lake
1885 - Empress Elisabeth ("Sissi") visits the Schmittenhöhe (mountain)
1887 - The municipality takes over ship navigation on Lake Zell
1893 - Visit of the Austrian Emperor Franz Josef I
1894 - The Grand Hotel is built
1898 - Business start of the Pinzgau Local Railway (Pinzgauer Lokalbahn)
1906 - Foundation of the Zell am See Skiing Club; first winter sports festival
1906 and 1910 - Acquisition of electric motor boats, end of steamship navigation
1914 - Railway double tracked
1924 - A light plane lands on the frozen Lake Zell
1928 - Construction of the tennis courts (used for ice-skating and ice-hockey in winter)
1928, January 25 - Commissioning of the Schmittenhöhebahn (up to the Schmitten mountain)
1928 - Foundation of a chapter of the Austrian Aeronautical Association (Österr. Flugtechnischer Verein)
1930 - Opening of the Hauptschule (similar to a UK secondary modern school)
1937, February 5 - Academic World Wintergames
1945 - City serves as a base for Company "E" of the 2nd Battalion, 506th Parachute Infantry Regiment (PIR), 101st Airborne Division. (See Band of Brothers)
1952, May 8 - Opening of the Alpine Gliding School
1959, May 15 - Opening of Zell Airport 
1961 - Zell receives the status of a climatic spa
1966 - Serious damage caused by thunderstorms; the River Schmitten overflows its banks
1968 - Construction of the Spa and Sport Center and foundation of the Europe Sport Region
1973 - Ski-World Cup (12 to 20 December)
1975 - Rosenberg Castle (16th century) becomes the town hall
1976 - Opening of the new hospital
1977 - Commissioning of the one-rope chairlift "Zeller Bergbahn"
1979 - Opening of the pedestrian area
1979 - Women's Down-hill World Cup
1981 - Honorary citizen: Dr.h.c. Ferdinand Porsche
1981 - Honorary citizen: Commercial Council Dr.h.c. Louise Piech-Porsche
1989 - Barry and Helen Knight spent their honeymoon at the Hotel Lebzelter
1996 - Opening of the road tunnel (Schmitten Tunnel, 5,110 m)
2000 - Award ceremony of the Sydney Olympic winners Steinacher and Hagara (Tornado-Sailing)
2004 - Award ceremony of the Athens Olympic winners Steinacher and Hagara (Tornado-Sailing)
2005 - Naming of the third ship on Lake Zell, the "Schmittenhöhe"
2008 - World Hockey Tournament
2012 - Zell am See and Kaprun host the Ironman 70.3 Zell am See-Kaprun triathlon for the first time
2015 - Zell am See and Kaprun host the Ironman 70.3 World Championship, which is held outside US & Canada for the first time

(Source: Custos Cav. H. Scholz)

Attractions

St Hippolyte's Church
Within St Hippolyte's Church are the oldest known building remnants of the Pinzgau region. The church is built in a mostly Romanesque style and consists of three naves. Before 1794, the central nave was crowned with a Gothic vault, but in that year it was replaced with another vault, which in turn was replaced by a flat wooden roof in 1898. Four steps lead up to the main altar, but the crypt has been filled in. The narthex and aisles are still Gothic, but some of the other Gothic objects (like the neogothic altars by Josef Bachlehner) were added during the renovation in 1898, when also the baroque furnishings of preceding centuries were removed.

The highpoint of the church is its elevated walkway with its ornate parapet, built in 1514. The walkway rests on four carved columns of precious marble, in between which an intricate net-vault is spun. The three pointed arches are crowned with crockets, and end in pointed towers. Between the arches are Gothic baldachins with cut-out figures of St Hippolyte and St Florian, originating from 1520.

The tower is the main focus of the Zell am See skyline. The strong walls have a limestone exterior.

From 1660 until 1670, the main altar was replaced by a Baroque one, which was removed again in 1760. Almost none of the Baroque furnishings of the church remain apart from some adornments. Two Baroque statues ended up in the church of Prielau. Next to the main altar are two statues dating from 1480: St Rupert and St Vigilius. The side altar contains an image of the Virgin Mary from the now non-existent Church of Maria Wald, which dates from 1540. The left nave has a small altar dedicated to St Sebastian in its apsis.

The Grand Hotel Zell am See is situated in a unique position on a private peninsula right at the shore of Lake Zell, this large chalet is surrounded by water with a panoramic view of the mountains.

The Porsche family farm is located in Zell am See, having been obtained in 1939 by the senior Ferdinand Porsche in anticipation of the war. During the war, he transferred some of his business operations here and to Gmünd, away from Stuttgart where, notwithstanding the heavy bombing, his son Ferry Porsche remained to oversee plant operations.

Education

In Zell am See there are three elementary schools, one high school, one special school, one vocational school, one grammar school, one commercial academy and a commercial school:
Volksschule Zell am See
Volksschule Schüttdorf
Volksschule Thumersbach
Mittelschule & Musikmittelschule Zell am See
Dr. Ernst Höfer Schule
Polytechnische Schule Zell am See
Landesberufsschule Zell am See
Bundesgymnasium und Bundesrealgymnasium Zell am See
Bundeshandelsakademie und Bundeshandelsschule Zell am See

Films shot in Zell am See

 1944/45: Film Ein Mann gehört ins Haus directed by Hubert Marischka.
 1963: Film  directed by Franz Marischka.
 2001: Miniseries Band of Brothers "Part Ten - Points", directed by Mikael Salomon, executive producers Steven Spielberg and Tom Hanks.

People 
 1937: Herbert Feuerstein, Austrian and German journalist, comedian and entertainer
 1948: Otto Brusatti, Austrian musicologist and radio personality
 1991: Stefan Brennsteiner, Austrian ski racer

See also
 Salzburgerland
 Pinzgauer Lokalbahn

References

External links
 
 
 
 

 
Cities and towns in Zell am See District